Shooting Range is a 1979 Soviet animation film directed by Vladimir Tarasov. The film is twenty-one minutes long and is set to jazz music. It is a satirical critique of capitalism and life in the United States.

Plot
In New York City, an unemployed young man (Based on Holden Caulfield) finds a job in a shooting gallery as a living target. After a while, the man falls in love and lives in the gallery with his wife at gunpoint. Finally, they give birth to baby, and the shooting range owner wants to use it as another target, too. Disgusted, the family flies off, but there are a lot of other unemployed people to fill their position.

External links

 

 
 

1979 films
Russian and Soviet animated science fiction films
Films by Vladimir Tarasov
Soyuzmultfilm
Russian animated short films